is a Japanese former professional breaststroke swimmer. She competed in two events at the 1968 Summer Olympics.

References

External links
 

1951 births
Living people
Japanese female breaststroke swimmers
Olympic swimmers of Japan
Swimmers at the 1968 Summer Olympics
Sportspeople from Osaka Prefecture
20th-century Japanese women